Tipton Correctional Center is located in the city of Tipton, Missouri.  Located on 150 acres, the initial construction was started in 1913.  Total square footage of all buildings is 326,860 sq. ft.  The address of this facility is 619 North Osage Street, ZIP code 65081-8038. Office of Administration, Facilities Management, Design and Construction.

References

Buildings and structures in Moniteau County, Missouri
Prisons in Missouri
1913 establishments in Missouri